Anakeesta Knob is a mountain in the Great Smoky Mountains National Park in Tennessee.

Description
Anakeesta Knob is located in the central Great Smoky Mountains in Sevier County, Tennessee. It is situated between Mount LeConte to the northwest, and Mount Kephart and Charlies Bunion to the east. The mountain is largely forested, and contains exposed rock outcroppings on its summit. Anakeesta Knob is accessible via The Boulevard Trail, which runs between Mount Le Conte and the Appalachian Trail at Mount Kephart. The name "Anakeesta" means "the place of high ground" in the Cherokee language.

References

Mountains of Great Smoky Mountains National Park
Mountains of Sevier County, Tennessee
Protected areas of Sevier County, Tennessee